In English orthography, many words feature a silent  (single, final, non-syllabic ‘e’), most commonly at the end of a word or morpheme. Typically it represents a vowel sound that was formerly pronounced, but became silent in late Middle English or Early Modern English.

In a large class of words, as a consequence of a series of historical sound changes, including the Great Vowel Shift, the presence of a suffix on the end of a word influenced the development of the preceding vowel, and in a smaller number of cases it affected the pronunciation of a preceding consonant. When the inflection disappeared in speech, but remained as a historical remnant in the spelling, this silent  was reinterpreted synchronically as a marker of the surviving sounds.

This can be seen in the vowels in word-pairs such as rid  and ride , in which the presence of the final, unpronounced  appears to alter the sound of the preceding . An example with consonants is the word-pair loath (loʊθ) and loathe (loʊð), where the  can be understood as a marker of a voiced .

Although Modern English orthography is not entirely consistent here, the correlation is common enough to allow a rule-of-thumb to be used to explain the spelling, especially in early schooling, where a silent  which has this effect is sometimes called a magic  or bossy . Orthographic linguist Gina Cooke uses the term replaceable  since the replaceability is the consistent mark of the single final nonsyllabic , and its 'silence' differs from other 'silent' letters' functions. Some practitioners of Structured Word Inquiry have adopted that terminology.

Effect on vowels
Depending on dialect, English has anywhere from 13 to more than 20 distinct vowel phonemes, both monophthongs and diphthongs. A silent , in association with the Latin alphabet's five vowel characters, is one of the ways by which some of these vowel sounds are represented in English orthography.

A silent  in association with the other vowels may convert a short vowel sound to a long vowel equivalent, though that may not always be the case. However, because of the complications of the Great Vowel Shift, the long vowel is not always simply a lengthened version of the corresponding short one; and in most cases (for example with ride) is in fact a diphthong.

To create a long vowel, there is usually only one consonant between the silent  and the preceding vowel. In some cases two consonants may also have the same effect, as in table, paste and bathe, while in other cases no consonants are also found, as in tie, toe and due.

This terminology reflects the historical pronunciation and development of those vowels, but as a phonetic description of their current values it may no longer be accurate. The Great Vowel Shift leading to Early Modern English gave current English "long vowels" values that differ markedly from the "short vowels" that they relate to in writing. Since English has a literary tradition that goes back into the Middle English period, written English continues to use Middle English writing conventions to mark distinctions that had been reordered by the chain shift of the long vowels. However, the pronunciation of  before silent , found mainly in borrowings from French and Latin, is a consequence not of the Great Vowel Shift but of a different series of changes.

When final  is not silent, this may be indicated in various ways in English spelling. When representing , this is usually done via doubling (refugee, employee, with employe as an obsolete spelling). Non-silent  can also be indicated by a diacritical mark, such as a grave accent (learnèd) or a diaeresis (learnëd, Brontë). Other diacritical marks are preserved in loanwords (résumé, café, blasé), or introduced on this pattern (maté), though these diacritics are frequently omitted.

The  group
See broad A and cot–caught merger for some of the cross-dialect complexities of the English  group.

The  group
Some parts of Mid-Ulster English still use .

The  group

The  group
Short  often falls in with short  and shares some of the complexities of that group. The usual effect of silent  on written  is to fix it as a long  sound.

The  group
Silent  generally turns  to its corresponding long version , which developed from Middle English .

Effect on consonants
For example:

Măc > mācɇ ( → )
stăg > stāgɇ ( → )

To stop this softening effect, a silent  is added before , as in “plague”, “fugue” and “catalogue.”

The same softening effect (  and  ) also arises with a following (i) or (y).

 bath, bathe
 breath, breathe
 cloth, clothe

Truly silent 
In some common words that historically had long vowels, silent  no longer has its usual lengthening effect.

Some loanwords from French (promenade) retained their French silent , called e muet or e caduc, which has no effect on the preceding vowel. Also, the feminine forms of some words of French origin end in a silent , for example fiancée, 'petite and née.

Some English words vary their accented syllable based on whether they are used as nouns or as adjectives.  In a few words such as minute, this may affect the operation of silent : as an adjective, minúte ("small") has the usual value of  followed by silent , while as a noun mínute (the unit of time) silent  does not operate.  See initial-stress-derived noun for similar patterns that may give rise to exceptions.

Historically, following the French usage, it was the practice to add a silent  at the end of words for aesthetic purposes. In the past, the silent  was also added to many nouns for similar stylistic reasons, such as poste, teste, etc.

Dropping of silent 
A silent  is usually dropped when a suffix beginning with a vowel is added to a word, for example: cope to coping, trade to tradable, tense to tension, captive to captivate, plague to plaguing, secure to security, create to creator, etc. However, this is inconsistently applied, as in the case of liveable. In the case of the "-ment" suffix, there is also a divergence of practice. In American English, judge usually becomes judgment, while in British English the e is usually retained, as in judgement. 

A silent  is not usually dropped in compound words, such as comeback.

History
Silent , like many conventions of written language that no longer reflect current pronunciations, was not always silent.  In Chaucer's Balade, the first line does not scan properly unless what appears to current eyes to be a silent  is pronounced:Hyd, Absolon, thy giltè tresses clerèGilte ends in the same sound as modern English Malta. In Middle English, this final schwa had some grammatical significance, although that was mostly lost by Chaucer's time.  It was elided regularly when a word beginning with a vowel came next.  The consequences of silent  in contemporary spelling reflect the phonology of Middle English.  In Middle English, as a consequence of the lax vowel rule shared by most Germanic languages, vowels were long when they historically occurred in stressed open syllables; they were short when they occurred in "checked" or closed syllables.  Thus bide  had a long vowel, while bid  had a short one.

The historical sequence went something like this:
 In Old English, a phonological distinction was made between long and short vowels.
 In Middle English, vowel length was lost as a phonological feature, but was still phonetically present. A word like bide, syllabified bi.de and phonetically , had one stressed, open, long syllable. On the other hand, the word bid, although stressed, had a short vowel: .
 At some point unknown, the phonetically long vowels began to diphthongize. This was the start of the Great Vowel Shift. Possibly at the same time, the short vowels became lax.
 At a later point, all word-final schwas were lost. The phonetic motivation for lengthening the vowel—the open syllable—was lost, but the process of diphthongization had already begun, and the vowels which had once been identical except for length were now phonetically dissimilar and phonologically distinct.

The writing convention of silent  indicates that different vowel qualities had become phonemic, and were preserved even when phonemic vowel length was lost.

Long vowels could arise by other mechanisms. One of these is known as "compensatory lengthening"; this occurred when consonants formerly present were lost: maid is the modern descendant of Old English mægde. In this example, the g actually became a glide , so in a sense, the length of the consonant stayed where it always had been, and there was no "compensation." The silent  rule became available to represent long vowels in writing that arose from other sources; Old English brŷd, representing *bruʒd-i-, became Modern English bride.

The rules of current English spelling were first set forth by Richard Mulcaster in his 1582 publication Elementarie.  Mulcaster called silent  "qualifying ", and wrote of it:
It altereth the sound of all the vowells, euen quite thorough one or mo consonants as, máde, stéme, éche, kínde, strípe, óre, cúre, tóste sound sharp with the qualifying E in their end: whereas, màd, stèm, èch, frind, strip, or, cut, tost, contract of tossed sound flat without the same E, And therefor the same loud and sharp sound in the word, calleth still for the qualifying e, in the end, as the flat and short nedeth it not. It qualifyeth no ending vowell, bycause it followeth none in the end, sauing i. as in daie, maie, saie, trewlie, safetie, where it maketh i, either not to be heard, or verie gentlie to be heard, which otherwise would sound loud and sharp, and must be expressed by y. as, deny, aby, ally. Which kinde of writing shalbe noted hereafter. It altereth also the force of, c, g, s, tho it sound not after them, as in hence, for that, which might sound henk, if anie word ended in c. in swinge differing from swing, in vse differing from vs.
Mulcaster also formulated the rule that a double letter, when final, indicated a short vowel in English, while the absence of doubling and the presence of silent  made the vowel long.  In modern English, this rule is most prominent in its effects on the written "a" series:
 gal, gall, gale.

Digraphs are sometimes treated as single letters for purposes of this rule:
 bath, bathe
 breath, breathe
 cloth, clothe

In popular culture

 Tom Lehrer wrote a song called "Silent E" for the children's television series The Electric Company in 1971.  In it, he asks the musical questions:Who can turn a căn into a cānɇ?Who can turn a păn into a pānɇ?It's not too hard to see.It's Silent "E"! A character is named "Silent E" in Between the Lions.
 A series of similar songs about "Magic E" was featured in the British educational series Look and Read between 1974 and 1994, written by Roger Limb and Rosanna Hibbert and performed by Derek Griffiths.
 In Alphablocks, Magic E is E's impish alter-ego, with a black ninja outfit and a top hat. He does not speak, but in the episode Magic, he sings a song about himself while he causes mischief.

 Notes and references 
Notes

References

See also
 I before E except after C
 Silent letter
 , the Gheg dialect of Albanian also uses "silent e" to mark long vowels earlier in the word

External links
Early Modern English (PDF)
Questions teachers ask about spelling by Shane Templeton and Darrell Morris (PDF)
Elementarie by Richard Mulcaster
Mulcaster's "Elementarie" by Richard Mulcaster
Silent E, complete lyrics by Tom Lehrer
Look and Read downloads , including a version of the Magic E'' song

E
E